The old consulate Denmark in Tunis is one of the monuments of the medina of Tunis.

Localisation 
The building is located in the European district of the medina near to Beb Bhar, in Al Zaytuna street.

History 
It was built in the 18th century as a primary school for boys. On 8 December 1751, Ali Pacha and Frederick V of Denmark signed a treaty by which the school became the consulate of the kingdom of Denmark and Norway.

References 

Buildings and structures in Tunis
Denmark–Turkey relations